EHC Neuwied is a professional ice hockey team in Neuwied, Germany. They play in the Oberliga, the third level of ice hockey in Germany. The club was founded in 1979.

Achievements
Champion of the 2nd Bundesliga : 1997, 1998.

External links
 Official site

Ice hockey teams in Germany
Ice hockey clubs established in 1979
Sport in Rhineland-Palatinate
1979 establishments in West Germany